Joachim Hansen (28 June 1930 – 13 September 2007) was a German actor. He was best known for film roles in the 1960s and 1970s in which he often portrayed Nazi officers and World War II German officials.

Of nearly sixty five film credits, Hansen's most notable roles include Der Stern von Afrika as Hans-Joachim Marseille, Jürgen Stroop in The Eagle Has Landed, and Generaloberst Alfred Jodl in The Winds of War and War and Remembrance mini-series.

Hansen was born in Frankfurt (Oder) and died in Berlin.

Selected filmography

 Ludwig II: Glanz und Ende eines Königs (1955) - Erzherzog Karl von Österreich, Kaiserin Elisabeths Bruder (uncredited)
 Der Stern von Afrika (1957) - Hans-Joachim Marseille
 Escape from Sahara (1958) - Kurt Gerber
 Laila (1958) - Anders Lind
  (1958) - Lorenz Ophofen
 Stalingrad: Dogs, Do You Want to Live Forever? (1959) - Oberleutnant Gerd Wisse
 The Forests Sing Forever (1959) - Young Dag
  (1959) - Heinz Horbach
  (1959) - Reporter Wolfgang Löhde
 The High Life (1960) - Le jeune automobiliste
 Der Satan lockt mit Liebe (1960) - Robert
 The Inheritance of Bjorndal (1960) - Dag
 When the Heath Is in Bloom (1960) - Rolf
 Ordered to Love (1961) - Oberleutnant Klaus Steinbach
 Via Mala (1961) - Andreas von Richenau
 Ramona (1961) - Steinberg
  (1962) - Insp. Robert Finch
 Das Mädchen und der Staatsanwalt (1962) - Patient
 Between Shanghai and St. Pauli (1962) - Jochen
 Trompeten der Liebe (1962) - Pfarrer Johannes Röll
 Kali Yug: Goddess of Vengeance (1963) - Lt. Collins
  (1963) - Lt. Collins
 The Cavern (1964) - German Sergeant
 Frozen Alive (1964) - Tony Stein
 Black Eagle of Santa Fe (1965) - Captain Jackson
 Diamond Walkers (1965) - Peter Wade
 Die letzten Drei der Albatros (1965) - Lieutenant Hannes Carstens
 Z7 Operation Rembrandt (1966) - Pierre
 Is Paris Burning? (1966) - Commandant prison de Fresnes
 Mission Stardust (1967) - Dr. Manoli
 Assignment K (1968) - Heinrich Herschel
  (1968) - Peter
  (1969) - Fabian von Weyden
 The Bridge at Remagen (1969) - Capt. Otto Baumann
 Our Doctor is the Best (1969) - Professor Frederik Janssen
 Underground (1970) - Hessler
 The Butterfly Affair (1971) - Freddy
  (1971, TV film) - Claus von Stauffenberg
  (1972)
 World on a Wire (1973, TV film) - Hans Edelkern
  (1974, TV film) - Torvald Helmer
  (1974) - Bernard
 Le vieux fusil (1975) - L'officier S.S.
 A Woman at Her Window (1976) - Stahlbaum
 The Eagle Has Landed (1976) - SS-Gruppenführer 
 The Boys from Brazil (1978) - Fassler
 Goetz von Berlichingen of the Iron Hand (1979) - Kaiserlicher Hauptmann
 Breakthrough (1979) - Capt. Kistner
  (1979) - Ullrich
  (1985) - Oberst Günter Priem

References

External links

 

1930 births
2007 deaths
People from Frankfurt (Oder)
People from the Province of Brandenburg
German male film actors
20th-century German male actors